John Rewi Fergusson Braithwaite (25 September 1897 – 15 January 1987) was an association football player who represented New Zealand, playing in New Zealand's first ever official international.

Braithwaite made his full New Zealand debut in that country's inaugural A-international fixture, beating Australia 3–1 on 17 June 1922 and ended his international playing career with six  A-international caps to his credit, his final cap an appearance in a 4–1 win over Australia on 30 June 1923.

Braithwaite later served as a St Kilda borough councillor, representing the Labour Party.

References 

1897 births
1987 deaths
New Zealand association footballers
New Zealand international footballers

Association football defenders
Rewi
Local politicians in New Zealand
New Zealand Labour Party politicians
Association footballers from Dunedin